Isoko is an Edoid language, one of the languages in Delta State spoken by the Isoko people in Isoko South, North and part of Ndokwa East Local Government Areas  of Delta State, Southern part of Nigeria in Niger Delta region. It is also spoken in some part of Bayelsa.  The Isoko language  has close similarities between them and Edo people with other Edoid language because it is an Edoid language,the Isoko people are “an ethnic nationality made up of people and their ancestral roots can be traced through history to  the Benin (Aka) kingdom,  attested to by the linguistic and cultural similarities that exist between the Isoko people and the Benin (Aka)people” although a few of the Isoko communities or clans  have their origins attached to the Ibo language and  Urhobo language. Some 750,000 people consider themselves Isoko. Language is a mark of identity and plays an all-important role in the life of a people. The Isoko language  however, is being threatened with extinction as reported by Idudhe (2002), as a result of neglect in teaching, learning and use. The Isoko language has about 20 to 21 dialects, but the Aviara/Uzere dialect is the standard dialect of the language.

Michael A. Marioghae, working with Peter Ladefoged in 1962, made one of a few audio recordings of sample Isoko words that are made available at the UCLA phonetics archive.

Phonology 
Alphabet

A B D E Ẹ F G H I J K L M N O Ọ P R S T U V W Y Z

The Vowels

A E Ẹ I O Ọ U

The Consonants

B D F G H J K L M N P R S T V W Y Z

Digraphs

GB, GH, KP, HW, WH, TH, SH, NW, NY, CH

Some greetings in Isoko Language

References

External links 
 Audio recordings available in ISOKO
 Voiced labiodental fricatives or glides - all the same to Germans?

Edoid languages